Thorpe in the Glebe was a village in Nottinghamshire to the south of Wysall on the Leicestershire border.  It was sometimes called Thorpe in the Clottes.  Tradition has it that the village was destroyed either at the Battle of Willoughby Field or alternatively by a hail-storm. However, at the time of the English Civil War, there had been no village at Thorpe in the Glebe for nearly 200 years.

The area is now a civil parish of the same name.

References

Wolds Historical Association
Lost Village Sites of Nottinghamshire

Rushcliffe
Deserted medieval villages in Nottinghamshire